Guy Kiala (born 16 April 1969) is a Belgian football manager and former player who made 192 appearances in the Belgian First and Second Divisions playing for K.R.C. Mechelen and K.F.C. Verbroedering Geel.

Football career
He started his youth career with K.R.C. Mechelen, before joining the seniors (then in first and second division). After 9 years playing in Mechelen, he earned a move to K.F.C. Verbroedering Geel (second division) where he played for 2 seasons. He finished his career with 1 season at Racing Jet Wavre and 2 seasons at KAV Dendermonde, before he continued his career in football as a trainer.

Managerial career
During his time at K.R.C. Mechelen, Kiala combined his football career as a coach for the club's youth teams. But his coaching career of senior teams started in 2000 when joining as an assistant coach at KSK Sint-Paulus Opwijk (fourth division). Where he also trained youth teams. And in 2008, assistant coach Kiala became head coach after trainer Vandevelde left the club. Despite a 7 to 9 in the final round he left the club to become head coach at Eendracht Opstal (fourth division).

From 2005 till 2010 he combined his civil training career with that of assistant coach of the Belgium National Military Football Team. And this with both men and women teams. 

In 2010, he became 'Revalidation Coach and video Analyst' at SV Zulte Waregem (women). Later in 2012 he became the team's head coach which finished in fifth place in the BeNe League. And he obtained his UEFA Pro Licence in the same class as Bob Peeters.

Late 2013 he became T3 at the Freethiel at Waasland-Beveren.

Guy Kiala, had a chance to become coach of the England women's national football team. But went together with Bob Peeters in 2014 (with whom he has collaborated with Waasland-Beveren) to Charlton Athletic F.C. In January 2015, after the club sacked head coach Bob Peeters, Senior Professional Development Coach Patrick Van Houdt and Performance Analyst Kiala were also fired. At the time Charlton had won once in the previous 12 games and had slipped to 14th in the Championship table.

In August 2015, Kiala moved to the Kingdom of Saudi Arabia where he became Academy Technical Director at Al-Ahli Saudi FC

In August 2018, Kiala moved to the city of Al Ain, Abu Dhabi, United Arab Emirates where he became coach at Al Ain FC.

In 2019 he met his former Coach Michel Sablon who now was Technical Director of the UAE FA. Guy Kiala became head of the Coach Educators and together they implemented a new way of educating UAE coaches. The project became a pilot for the AFC, the Asian Football Confederation.

Guy Kiala is currently working as Technical Director and Head of youth development at  Al Ain FC.

References

Living people
1969 births
Belgian footballers
Association football defenders
K.R.C. Mechelen players
Racing Jet Wavre players
Belgian Pro League players
Belgian football managers
Belgian expatriates in England
People from Kalemie